The 1931 All-Big Ten Conference football team consists of American football players selected to the All-Big Ten Conference teams chosen by various selectors for the 1931 Big Ten Conference football season.

All Big-Ten selections

Ends
 Paul Moss, Purdue (AP-1, CPT, UP-1)
 Ivy Williamson, Michigan (AP-1, UP-1)
 Bill Hewitt, Michigan (AP-2, CPT, UP-1 [halfback])
 Bradbury N. Robinson, III, Minnesota (AP-2)
 Dick Fencl, Northwestern (UP-2)
 Ted Petoskey, Michigan (UP-2)

Tackles
 Jack Riley, Northwestern (AP-1, CPT, UP-1)
 Dallas Marvil, Northwestern (AP-1, CPT, UP-1)
 William M. Bell, Ohio State (AP-2)
 Patrick H. Boland, Minnesota (AP-2)
 Howie Auer, Michigan (UP-2)

Guards
 Biggie Munn, Minnesota (AP-1, CPT, UP-1
 Greg Kabat, Wisconsin (AP-1, CPT, UP-2 [tackle])
 Joe Zeller, Indiana (AP-2, UP-1)
 James R. Evans, Northwestern (AP-2)
 Sam Horwitz, Chicago (UP-2)
 Joseph T. Gailus, Ohio State (UP-2)

Centers
 Maynard Morrison, Michigan (AP-1, CPT, UP-2)
 Ookie Miller, Purdue (AP-2, UP-1)

Quarterbacks
 Carl Cramer, Ohio State (AP-1, CPT, UP-1)
 Harry Newman, Michigan (AP-2)
 Paul Pardonner, Purdue (UP-2)

Halfbacks
 Pug Rentner, Northwestern (AP-1, CPT, UP-1)
 Lew Hinchman, Ohio State (AP-1)
 Jim Purvis, Purdue (CPT)
 Stanley Fay, Michigan (AP-2, UP-2)
 Fred Hecker, Purdue (AP-2, UP-2)

Fullbacks
 Jack Manders, Minnesota (AP-1, CPT, UP-1)
 Ollie Olson, Northwestern (AP-2, UP-2)

Key

AP = Associated Press

CPT = Captain's team, chosen by votes of captains of Big Ten football teams

UP = United Press

Bold = Consensus first-team selection of the AP and UP

See also
1931 College Football All-America Team

References

1931 Big Ten Conference football season
All-Big Ten Conference football teams